Rhipha albiplaga is a moth in the family Erebidae. William Schaus described it in 1905. It is found in French Guiana and Amazonas.

References

Moths described in 1905
Phaegopterina
Arctiinae of South America